Yegor Ogiyenko (born March 10, 1996) is a Russian professional ice hockey defenceman. He is currently playing with CSK VVS Samara of the Supreme Hockey League (VHL).

On February 24, 2015, Ogiyenko made his Kontinental Hockey League debut playing with HC CSKA Moscow during the 2014–15 KHL season.

References

External links

1996 births
Living people
HC CSKA Moscow players
Russian ice hockey defencemen
Ice hockey people from Moscow
Torpedo Nizhny Novgorod players